Zu & Co. Live at the Royal Albert Hall is a live DVD recording by Italian blues rock singer-songwriter Zucchero Fornaciari.

In 2005 it was certified Gold in Switzerland.

Track listing

References 

2004 compilation albums
Zucchero Fornaciari albums
Vocal duet albums
Polydor Records live albums